TB is an unincorporated community in Prince George's County, in the U.S. state of Maryland, near the intersection of highways MD 5 and US 301.

History
A post office called T.B. was established in 1860, and remained in operation until 1914. Some say the community has the name of Thomas Brooke, an early settler, while others believe partners William Townshend and Mr. Brooke each etched his respective last initial into stone at the original town site. TB has been noted for its unusually short place name.

References

Unincorporated communities in Prince George's County, Maryland
Unincorporated communities in Maryland